Metkazin (also Metkāzīn and Motkāzīn; also known as Metkāzamīn) is a village in Yaneh Sar District, Behshahr County, Mazandaran Province, Iran. At the 2006 census, its population was 399, living in 78 families.

References 

Populated places in Behshahr County